Konstantinos Mylonas (born 1916) was a Greek sports shooter. He competed at the 1948 Summer Olympics and 1952 Summer Olympics.

References

External links
 

1916 births
Year of death missing
Greek male sport shooters
Olympic shooters of Greece
Shooters at the 1948 Summer Olympics
Shooters at the 1952 Summer Olympics
Place of birth missing
Panathinaikos shooters
20th-century Greek people